The Department of Infrastructure, Transport, Regional Development and Cities was an Australian Public Service department of the Government of Australia that existed between December 2017 and May 2019, charged with the responsibility for infrastructure and major projects, transport, local government, external territories administration, rural and regional development, population policy, and cities.

When created on 20 December 2017, the department replaced the Department of Infrastructure and Regional Development. It was dissolved and remade as the Department of Infrastructure, Transport, Cities and Regional Development by Administrative Arrangements Orders made on 29 May 2019.

Location
The department was headquartered in the Canberra central business district at Infrastructure House and the neighbouring building to Infrastructure House.

Operational activities
In an Administrative Arrangements Order made on 20 December 2017, the functions of the department were broadly classified into the following matters:

Infrastructure planning and co-ordination
Transport safety, including investigations
Land transport
Civil aviation and airports
Maritime transport including shipping
Major projects office, including facilitation and implementation of all non-Defence development projects
Administration of the Jervis Bay Territory, the Territory of Cocos (Keeling) Islands, the Territory of Christmas Island, the Coral Sea Islands Territory, the Territory of Ashmore and Cartier Islands, and of Commonwealth responsibilities on Norfolk Island
Constitutional development of the Northern Territory
Constitutional development of the Australian Capital Territory
Delivery of regional and territory specific services and programmes
Planning and land management in the Australian Capital Territory
Regional development
Matters relating to local government
Regional policy and co-ordination
 National policy on cities
 Infrastructure and project financing
 Population policy

Structure and audit of expenditure
The department was administered by a senior executive, comprising the Secretary, Steven Kennedy, and several Deputy Secretaries.

The department's financial statements were audited by the Australian National Audit Office.

References

Australia
Transport organisations based in Australia
Australia
Australia, Infrastructure, Regional Development and Cities
2017 establishments in Australia
Infrastructure in Australia
Regions of Australia
Defunct government departments of Australia
2019 disestablishments in Australia